This is a list of the most important journals in Serbian history.

Academic

Other

See also
List of academic journals published in Serbia
List of Serbian-language magazines

References

Sources

External links

Journals, Serbian-language
 
Journals